Tan Sri Datuk Amar Lee Hun Hoe (27 September 1925 – 8 July 2005) was a Malaysian lawyer and judge who served as the fourth Chief Justice of Borneo.

Early life and education 
Lee was born the eldest son in Alor Setar in the then-British protectorate state of Kedah in 1925 before shortly moving to another British protectorate, the Raj of Sarawak on the island of Borneo, at the age of 1. Growing up in Kuching, Lee would complete his primary and secondary education in 1948. After electing to join the government service in 1949, he would serve in the secretariat department for a mere two years before being transferred to the judicial department in 1951. Then, he was awarded a Colonial and Development Fund Scholarship to read law at the University of Southampton in the United Kingdom. In 1955, Lee graduated from the university with a Bachelor of Laws with honours (LL.B. (Hons)).

Upon graduation, Lee was called to the English Bar at Lincoln's Inn. There, he received his postgraduate certificate from the Council of Legal Education and returned to Sarawak thereafter.

Career 
Following Lee's return from the UK, he served as a stipendiary magistrate from 1956 to 1965. Concurrently, he had also acted as Crown Counsel, deputy public prosecutor (DPP) and registrar. Later, he was also appointed chairman of the advisory committee from 1962 to 1964. Throughout his career, Lee would on various occasions be appointed judicial commissioner whenever a High Court judge was unavailable.

On 17 May 1965, Lee was promoted to the High Court in Borneo Bench. This led to him being appointed as chairman of the Royal Commission of Inquiry (RCI) to look into the practice and administration of the Seremban Town Board. After two years as judge, Lee was posted to Sabah on 30 August 1967 to serve as senior puisne judge. On 1 January 1974, he was appointed to the office of Chief Justice of Borneo. Lee held that office until his retirement on 31 December 1990. Lee currently holds the distinction of being the longest serving Chief Justice of the High Court in Borneo, now renamed the High Court in Sabah and Sarawak.

Honours 
  :
  Commander of the Order of the Defender of the Realm (PMN) - Tan Sri (1974)
  :
  Member of the Order of Kinabalu (ADK)
  Commander of the Order of Kinabalu (PGDK) - Datuk
  Grand Commander of the Order of Kinabalu (SPDK) - Datuk Seri Panglima
  :
  Knight Commander of the Order of the Star of Sarawak (PNBS) - Dato Sri
  Knight Commander of the Order of the Star of Hornbill Sarawak (DA) - Datuk Amar (1988)

Personal life 
Lee was married to Puan Sri Datin Amar Fredia Temiang Wong, together, they have four daughters and an adopted son.

 Chairman of Hexza Corporation Limited
 Chairman of Wah Tat Bank
 Chairman of Natural Avenue Propriety Limited

Death 
Lee passed away on 8 July 2005 after a short illness at his home in Kuching.

References 

1925 births
2005 deaths
People from Kedah
People from Alor Setar
20th-century Malaysian judges
Malaysian people of Chinese descent
Commanders of the Order of the Defender of the Realm
Knights Commander of the Most Exalted Order of the Star of Sarawak
Knights Commander of the Order of the Star of Hornbill Sarawak
Grand Commanders of the Order of Kinabalu
Commanders of the Order of Kinabalu
Alumni of the University of Southampton
Members of Lincoln's Inn